Allegiance bias (or allegiance effect) in behavioral sciences is a bias resulted from the investigator's or researcher's allegiance to a specific school of thought.
 Researchers/investigators have been exposed to many types of branches of psychology or schools of thought. Naturally they adopt a school or branch that fits with their paradigm of thinking. More specifically, allegiance bias is when this leads therapists, researchers, etc.  believing that their school of thought or treatment is superior to others. Their superior belief to these certain schools of thought can bias their research in effective treatments trials or investigative situations leading to allegiance bias.  Reason being is that they may have devoted their thinking to certain treatments they have seen work in their past experiences. This can lead to a fundamental errors to the results of their research they are conducting. Their “pledge” to stay within their own paradigm of thinking may affect their ability to find more effective treatments to help the patient or situation they are investigating.

History  
“Therapeutic allegiance of the experimenter was first used by Luborsky Singer, and Luborsky" in a journal article published in 1975. The basis of their study looked for comparisons among some psychotherapy practices. They found that patients fared better when combined treatments of therapies were used versus only one treatment applied. They found the strongest allegiance are those therapists who are the authors of new implemented practices or supervise others in a practice. They will tend to use their treatment more often.

Psychotherapy 
Some reasons why this is occurs in psychotherapy is that there are many new therapies being implemented and researched. Supported research explains that those who develop "specific psychotherapy treatments show more interest for the evidence-based practice of their own therapies compared to others."

Forensic psychology 
Most often forensic experts indulge in having formed a biased opinion of the assessment in favor of the party retaining their services as opposed to having it objective by means of the evidence available. Some studies have been conducted evaluating biases in legal cases.  They observed that forensic psychologists may be hired by a particular party or attorney, because they have a preexisting attitude “in favor of capital punishment and would be more favorable to accept capital case referrals from particular adversarial parties.” That they may have a partial preexisting allegiance to certain legal cases that favor their opinions. These biases can disrupt justice in legal cases which can be dangerous to our society.   The American Psychological Association knows the effects of biases and have prepared guidelines for these preexisting attitudes and biases to help forensic psychologists to be objective when choosing court cases.

Analyses 
Another area that allegiance bias is found is when authors/researchers are critiquing each other's work. Some studies make claims that a previous article confirmed bias and so on. It is important to analyze these authors, who are making these claims, on how they are coming to their conclusion. These authors may be also demonstrating allegiance bias by testing previous articles to their own work and overexerting the conclusion they have found. These authors are ironically using allegiance bias to verify their work as being correct.

Critiques  

Despite the fact that researchers find the outcomes of psychological evaluations to be influenced from allegiance from a specific school of thought, the role of allegiance in the research field should be evaluated cautiously. Several meta-analyses have shown contradictory results between experimenter's allegiance (EA) and assessment effect sizes in favor of the preferred conclusions. These are meta-analysis that examines a combination of psychotherapy and non-psychotherapy treatments (e.g., medication) if it was directly compared with another type of psychotherapy or meta-analysis evaluating direct comparisons between different types of psychotherapy. Meta-analysis assessing non-verbal techniques, web-based treatments and non-specific or miscellaneous treatments (e.g., yoga, dietary advice, recreation, biofeedback, etc.) should also be excluded.

Sensitivity 
The analysis on direct comparisons did not address the quality of studies and neither did it have any significant association between allegiant and non-allegiant studies; whereas significant differences were observed in cases where treatment integrity was not evaluated.

In legal cases, evaluator attitudes and other attributes may systematically influence from whom evaluators are willing to accept a referral. Filtering and selection effects in adversarial settings have been assumed to exist, but with few empirical tests of the hypothesis to date. Current studies demonstrate that these experts have preexisting biases that may affect for whom they are willing to work in the adversarial system–thus, likely amplifying the effects of the system-induced biases when layered with preexisting expert biases.

Rating

Remedies

Objective methods 
 Creating a list - this would be the simplest method for a professional to hypothesize all/any possibilities that would seem reasonable, at the inception of an evaluation process.
 Surveillance

Disclosures

Reporting policies 
Systematic reviews and meta-analysis are essential to summarise evidence relating to efficacy and safety of healthcare interventions accurately and reliably. The clarity and transparency of these reports, however, are not optimal. Poor reporting of systematic reviews diminishes their value to clinicians, policy makers, and other users.

QUOROM 

Since the development of the QUOROM (quality of reporting of meta-analysis) statement—a reporting guideline published in 1999—there have been several conceptual, methodological, and practical advances regarding the conduct and reporting of systematic reviews and meta-analysis. Also, reviews of published systematic reviews have found that key information about these studies is often poorly reported.

PRISMA 

Realizing these issues, an international group that included experienced authors and methodologists developed PRISMA (preferred reporting items for systematic reviews and meta-analysis) as an evolution of the original QUOROM guideline for systematic reviews and meta-analysis of evaluations of health care interventions.

The PRISMA statement consists of a 27-item checklist and a four-phase flow diagram. The checklist includes items deemed essential for transparent reporting of a systematic review. In this explanation and elaboration document, they have explained the meaning and rationale for each checklist item & have include an example of good reporting, while also where possible, references to relevant empirical studies and methodological literature.

Conflict of interest

Assessment

See also 

 Bias
 Impartiality
 Empiricism
 Conformity

References

External links 
 PRISMA statement - Who should use PRISMA?
 Mechanisms and direction of allocation bias in randomised clinical trials
 Researcher allegiance in psychotherapy outcome research: An overview of reviews
 A new era for intervention development studies

Communication of falsehoods
Prejudices
Decision theory